Willem Hendrik van den Bos (25 September 1896 – 30 March 1974) was a Dutch astronomer who worked at the Union Observatory in South Africa and became its director in 1941. He discovered nearly  new double stars, made more than  astronomical measurements and compiled a catalogue of Southern hemisphere double stars. He computed the orbits of more than 100 double stars using a method he invented and which later became the accepted standard.

Biography 
Van den Bos was born in Rotterdam in 1896. He studied astronomy at Leiden University and worked at the Leiden Observatory. In 1925 he completed his PhD in astronomy under the supervision of Willem de Sitter and was invited by R.T.A. Innes to join the Union Observatory in Johannesburg for a three-year appointment as assistant to the director, H.E. Wood. Innes was eager to have an experienced observer of double-stars to share the workload on the newly erected telescope.

Van den Bos extended his appointment at the Union Observatory indefinitely and in 1941 was appointed Director of the observatory. He retired from the observatory in 1956 but continued his observations both in South Africa and the United States until 1966 when he was forced to stop owing to severe illness.

During the 31 years of his career he discovered  new double stars and made  astronomical measurements. He compiled a catalogue from previous observations of southern hemisphere double stars that was incorporated into the Index Catalog of Visual Double Stars, published in 1963, with the collaboration of H.M. Jeffries and F.M. Greeby of the Lick Observatory, California.  The catalogue later became the Washington Double Star Catalog.

Van den Bos developed his own method of measuring the orbits of double stars and used it to measure the orbits of more than 100 binary stars. His method became the accepted standard procedure.

Recognition, memberships, awards 
 President of the Double Star Commission of the International Astronomical Union for 14 years.
 Royal Danish Academy Gold Medal
 Gill Medal from the Astronomical Society of Southern Africa
 President of the Astronomical Society of Southern Africa in 1943 and 1955
The 1969 Double-star Colloquium of the International Astronomical Union in Nice was dedicated to Van den Bos.
The asteroid 1663 van den Bos is named after him, as is the lunar crater van den Bos.

References

External links 

1896 births
1974 deaths
20th-century Dutch astronomers
Dutch emigrants to South Africa
Leiden University alumni
Van den Bos, Willem Hendrik
Scientists from Rotterdam